Belle Isle (French for "Beautiful Island") is an uninhabited island slightly more than  off the coast of Labrador and slightly less than  north of Newfoundland at the Atlantic entrance to the Strait of Belle Isle, which takes its name.

Named by the French explorer Jacques Cartier, the island lies on the shortest shipping lane between the Great Lakes and Europe and is on the main north-south shipping route to Hudson Bay and the Northwest Territories. The northern terminus of the International Appalachian Trail is on Belle Isle.

Geography

Officially uninhabited, the island has some seasonal occupation during fishing season.

Ice patterns show that the island lies at the meeting point of two sea currents. The Labrador Current flows from the northwest, and a smaller current, driven by dominant westerly winds, flows from the southwest. Flow lines in sea ice give a sense of the movement of the ice. Ice floes embedded in the Labrador Current appear as a relatively open pattern. Sea ice with a denser pattern enters from the strait, banking against the west side of Belle Isle.

Tendrils flow around capes at both ends of the island, with an ice-free "shadow" on the opposite, downstream side. Eddies off the western coast in the ice patterns, indicated by curved arrows in this photograph, show the place in which the currents interact north and west of the island.

Climate
Belle Isle has a marginal subarctic climate (Köppen climate classification Dfc), exceptionally cold for a coastal location so far south as the 51st parallel. As an illustration, Dunkirk on the opposite side of the Atlantic averages  warmer for the year as a whole, due to the contrasting currents on the eastern and western sides of the Icelandic Low. The climate features short, cool summers and long, severely cold winters lasting most of the year. Precipitation peaks during the warmer months of June to September in the form of rain.

See also
List of communities in Newfoundland and Labrador
List of ghost towns in Newfoundland and Labrador

References

External links
Strait of Belle Isle ecoregion
Chart of The Strait of Belle Isle and Belle Isle by Captain James Cook

Uninhabited islands of Newfoundland and Labrador